Kumaran Madathil (15 July 192030 March 1995) was an Indian politician and leader of Communist Party of India. He represented Perambra constituency in 1st Kerala Legislative Assembly and Nadapuram constituency in 4th Kerala Legislative Assembly.

References

Communist Party of India politicians from Kerala